Gardaneh ye Kuli Kesh Romanized Gardaneh i Kuli Kash, Gardaneh e quli Kosh ( or  or ) is a mountain pass of the Zagros mountain Range.

References

External links
 gardaneh-ye-kuli-kesh
 gardananeh ye Kowli Kosh

Landforms of Iran
Mountain passes of Iran